Remittances to Azad Kashmir are money transfers from Azad Kashmiri diaspora employed outside the territory to family, friends or relatives residing in Azad Kashmir.

References

Remittances
Economy of Azad Kashmir
Azad Kashmiri diaspora